Charles Henry Belknap (1841 – October 6, 1926) was a justice of the Supreme Court of Nevada from 1872 to 1875, and from 1881 to 1904.

Born in New York, Belknap moved to Nevada where he served two terms as mayor of Virginia City, Nevada, and later became a lower court judge. In 1873, he was appointed to the state supreme court by Governor Lewis R. Bradley, but was defeated in a bid for reelection to the seat the following year. In 1880, he again ran for the seat and this time was elected, thereafter remained on the court until 1904.

In 1873, Belknap married Virginia Bradley, the daughter of Governor Bradley, with whom he had four children who survived him. Following Belknap's retirement from the court, he moved to San Francisco, California, where he remained until his death at the age of 85, two weeks after the death of his wife.

References

Justices of the Nevada Supreme Court
1841 births
1926 deaths
People from New York (state)
Mayors of places in Nevada
Chief Justices of the Nevada Supreme Court